The Art Center of Western Colorado, formerly known as The Western Colorado Center for the Arts, also known as The Art Center, is located at 1803 North Seventh Street in Grand Junction, Colorado. Founded in 1953, the art center features four galleries, a gift shop, two enclosed courtyards, and several working studios and classrooms. The center contains a diverse permanent collection of mostly regional Western art.  Programming includes two-dimensional and three-dimensional visual art and educational programs for children, adults and people with special needs.

Permanent collection 
The Art Center maintains over 600 works of art in its permanent collection, the some of which are owned by the Art Center Foundation. The collection includes significant holdings in western landscape painting, Navajo rugs, and Ancestral Puebloan pottery. A rich assortment of media make up the collection, from oil and acrylic to bronze, serigraphs, lithographs and etchings. The collection features many local artists from the mid-20th century to the present day, including several Art Center founders. The two most represented artists are Alfred Nestler and Paul Pletka.  A collection of Japanese art—mostly ukiyo-e prints but also drawings, bugaku masks and woodcuts by Shiko Munakata—was bequeathed to the ACF in 2015 by local legend Bill Robinson, the founder and tireless promoter of Colorado Mesa University's theater department.

Programs and partnerships 
The Art Center offers a variety of classes, workshops and exhibits for individuals of all ages, skill levels and abilities. Volunteers and staff emphasize that art should be a community pursuit and not just an endeavor for the elite.

The Art Center offers an average of 15 regular classes each session, with five sessions per year. Additionally, the Art Center puts on 18 to 24 workshops per year, some led by nationally acclaimed artists.

Classes and workshops 
Classes and workshop topics cover painting, photography, stained glass, sculpture, figure drawing, mixed-media collage and ceramics.

Ceramics classes and workshops rank among the most popular. Artist-in-residence Terry Shepherd has taught raku, a fast-firing process for ceramics that originated in Japan, and other ceramics techniques, to Art Center students since the 1980s.

Workshops and classes for children have been a priority of the Art Center since its inception.  In 2015, 1,521 children attended summer Art Camps held over the course of 18 weeks.

Spring Art Week is a program designed to expose Mesa County elementary school children to a variety of art forms and materials through demonstrations by local artists. The center coordinates the program, in which artists explain and demonstrate their particular disciplines to small tour groups.  This intimate forum allows children to ask questions and become familiar with various art forms.  Teachers distribute packets of art projects that can easily be done when the children return to the classroom.  In 2015, 881 students visited the Art Center for Spring Art Week.

The Altrusa Art Fair has been organized by the Altrusa International service group for 60 years now. The middle- and high-school exhibits are meant to promote fresh, young talent that might otherwise go unnoticed.  Each school has the opportunity to compete for ribbons and certificates of merit.

The Artability program, which offers art classes to people with mental, social or physical special needs, is fast becoming one of the Art Center's most popular programs. Artability is a partnership with STRIVE, group homes and other organizations for the underserved in Grand Junction. In 2015, the Artability program provided 3,513 slots for participants. Many of the students are repeat attendees.  About 30 percent of the students are identified as mentally and/or physically challenged.

Community events 
The Art Center regularly serves as a community space for public events and private occasions like weddings or memorial celebrations. The first bar mitzvah in Grand Junction occurred at the Art Center.

Exhibits 
The Art Center hosts an average of 26 exhibits each year, some of which are annual events while the rest are signature events.  Some exhibits feature contemporary art alongside legacy work from the Art Center's permanent collection. Opening celebrations for new exhibits occur on the first Friday of each month.  Admittance is free, light food and beverages are served, and local musicians often perform.

Recurring exhibits 
Some of the longstanding recurring exhibits are listed below.

The Members Exhibit includes works produced by the Art Center's supporters.  At its inaugural show in 2006, the modest display occupied a single gallery.  By 2013, it dominated every gallery with hundreds of participating members from across the Western Slope of Colorado.

The Colorado Mesa University All Campus Exhibit is a juried show for students and faculty.

When the Contemporary Exhibit began in 2006, it was the first ceramics show of its kind in Grand Junction. Paul Soldner, who is credited with turning clay work into the art form it is today, was one of the guest artists, and the show received attention in "Clay Times" magazine.  Now, the original Contemporary Exhibit has been divided into two shows, and the Contemporary 2D exhibit alternates years with the Contemporary 3D exhibit.

The Colorado Art Educators Association Juried Exhibit features the work of art teachers from Colorado and Wyoming. Any artist who teaches art at any level, from kindergarten through college, is eligible to submit art for this exhibit.

The quinquennial exhibit "The Metalworkers" first appeared in 2009, underwritten by Western Slope Auto/Toyota Superstore.  This groundbreaking exhibit featured the varied metal art of 14 artists, half of whom were women and half of whom were men.  The second exhibit in 2014 included sculptures by local artists.  Large-scale works presented a striking contrast to the fine, detailed enameling work by late Grand Junction artist Margaret Kuntz which is now a part of the Art Center's permanent collection.  The next metalworkers' exhibit is slated for 2019.

The annual Student/Instructor Open Exhibit provides an opportunity for all Art Center class or workshop participants from the prior 12 months to show their work.

Unique exhibits and shows 
In addition to regular juried exhibits and shows by community groups and clubs, the Art Center has hosted many unique art exhibitions and performances, and even the occasional guest curator.

Notable past displays include:
 a Christo and Jeanne-Claude exhibition,
 prints by Mauricio Lasansky,
 a five-decade retrospective by Jac Kephart,
 the first exhibition of Frank Mechau's art in 20 years
 sculptural works by Michael Meyers
 abstract paintings by Andrew Roberts-Gray,
 abstracts by Meredith Nemirov, and
 a 2006 exhibition of work produced by Charles Partridge Adams, a Colorado native renowned for his landscape paintings.
The Art Center has periodically been home to sand mandalas created by Tibetan monks who travel the United States. The sand mandalas may take more than 100 hours to create, and all proceeds of the events associated with the monks' visit are donated to their monastery.

Other unique exhibits at the Art Center have featured drawings, collage, assemblage, photography, mixed media, children's book illustration, woodcraft ranging from carvings to furniture, skateboard and guitar design, videography, installation pieces, and the cumulative work of studio arts classes and workshops.

Partnerships 
For decades, the Art Center has worked in partnership with Colorado Mesa University (formerly Mesa State College) and the Museum of Western Colorado to host joint exhibitions, traveling exhibitions of nationally and internationally acclaimed art, lectures and workshops.

The Art Center also collaborates with local galleries to raise the visibility of local artists and their work.

The Art Center has partnered with other nonprofits to provide art scholarships to area students, and since 2008, the local nonprofit Super Rad Art Jam has brought Mesa County Valley School District 51 art students to the Art Center for a ceramics workshop, which they describe as "highlight of the year."

The Art Center Guild, which originally formed in 1979 under the name ACES (Art Center Energy Source), is a critical partner during two annual fund raising events: the Fine Art Auction and the Fine Arts and Crafts Fair. The Guild also raises funds for the center with a series of summer concerts, and it provides volunteers, food and refreshments at exhibition openings.

Clubs 
The Art Center provides exhibition space for local and regional artist clubs.  For some, it also serves as their regular meeting venue.  Notable recurring shows include the National Juried Western Colorado Watercolor Society Exhibit sponsored by the Western Colorado Watercolor Society and the annual Brush and Palette Club exhibition.  Other groups with a prominent presence at the Art Center include the Colorado West Quilters' Guild, the Pastel Society, the Western Colorado Bonsai Society, the Grand Junction-based Rocky Mountain Collage Society, and The Outsiders, which is a plein air painting group formed by a group of women who met while taking classes at the Art Center more than 25 years ago.

Facilities 
The current 16,700-square-foot facility includes:
 five exhibition galleries,
 a working studio/gallery space,
 3,000 square feet of classroom studio space,
 a gift shop,
 a enclosed courtyard and sculpture garden,
 climate-controlled art collection storage, and
 administrative offices.

Operations 
The workforce of The Art Center has evolved substantially from its origin as a purely volunteer-staffed nonprofit. Currently, the programs and displays are made possible by six paid, full-time staffers, two part-timers and a rotating group of teachers, and 300-plus volunteers.

Funding comes in a variety of ways, too:  Tuition (31%), membership (14%), donations and sponsorships (35%), art sales and commission (6%), facility rental (5%), admission (2%), and investments/other (7%).

In addition to funding the roughly $650,000 operating budget, there's always a need for more capital fundraising opportunities in hopes of making upgrades to the aging facility.

The Art Center has three significant fundraising events each year.

The annual Fine Arts Auction is the Art Center's biggest fund-raising event.  Admissions and sales support education and exhibition programs.  All art sold in the auction is original.  Artists from across the country contribute work to the sale, providing buyers with a wide variety from which to choose.

The Fine Arts and Crafts Fair has been held during the holidays annually since 1971 and is the Art Center's second largest fundraiser of the year. Featured sales items include homemade food, handmade jewelry, and a juried selection of original fine art, including paintings, pottery, stained glass, and metal sculptures.  Proceeds from this fair go toward lectures, children's camps, classes, and workshops which serve the entire Western Slope community.

The Ceramics Sale, which is held each autumn, sells donated original ceramic work specifically to fund the Art Center's ceramics studio.

History 
The Art Center, as it is commonly known, can trace its roots back to the Beaux Arts Club, which was formed by a small group of people interested in painting during the 1920s. After a lull during the Depression and World War II, the group renewed its activities under a new name, the Fine Arts Association.

In February 1953, the group became incorporated as the Mesa County Art Center.  In 1957, the organization was granted 501(c)(3) status, and in January 1968, members voted to change the name to the Western Colorado Center for the Arts.

Credit for transforming the small, 1940s art club into a formal nonprofit with an art center for the community is largely given to 21 individuals.  In 1947, Fred Mantey, a local philanthropist, offered to donate one acre and $1,000 for the purpose of creating an art center in Grand Junction.  Alfred Nestler, an interior decorator, prominent artist of the region, and Mantey's son-in-law, promoted the idea and enlisted other artists to help organize the effort. After much behind-the-scenes work, Mantey's donation became official in 1953.

Other people who devoted significant resources and time to the founding of the Art Center and served on its board included:
 E.L. Bacon- president of US Bank at the time
 Josephine Biggs
 Verona Burkhard - a nationally known artist and teacher, she designed and created the copper doors in the first building constructed to house the Art Center
 Bryce Carpenter
 Helen Crosbie- a nationally known sculptor
 Dr. Stanley Crosbie
 Lucy Ela- a former member of the Beaux Art Club, she wrote the Art Center's constitution and bylaws.
 Dr. Kenneth Graves- one of the founders of Community Hospital
 Glenn Hopper- owner of Intermountain Printing at the time
 Jessie Jones
 Helen Martin
 Ruth G. Moss
 Conway Nowlan
 Clarence Prinster- one of four brothers who developed the City Market grocery store chain, he pursued oil painting as a hobby.
 Alvie Redden- the first full-time art instructor at Colorado Mesa University (formerly Mesa State College)
 George Unkless
 Gretl Waldapfel
 Dr. Richard Waldapfel
 Sterling Smith
While raising funds for a building of their own, the board and volunteers presented art programs at various locations in Grand Junction. They could be found promoting the arts at such places as elementary schools and city hall.  They also circulated art masterpiece reproductions in Mesa County Valley School District 51 schools, and operated a rental gallery where an average of 500 paintings per month were loaned to businesses and private residences.  By 1940, the group had purchased six paintings for the Art Center's permanent collection. These art works were stored for safe keeping at the central branch of the Mesa County Public Library and at Mesa Junior College (which later became Colorado Mesa University).

The fundraising campaign included artists' balls, exhibits, sidewalk art sales, musical shows and rummage sales.

One effort petitioned school children to buy a brick' for the new building for 25 cents.  According to the Art Center, every student attending local schools bought a brick.

Art clubs in the area, including the Brush and Palette Club, Paint for Pleasure, the Wednesday Music Club, and the original Colorado chapter of the American Artists Professional League, supported fundraising efforts with projects of their own.

In 1957, with approval from Mantey's widow, the board of trustees decided to sell the land given to the organization by Fred Mantey, deeming it too far out of town to serve as a good location for a community arts center.

In May 1960, the organization bought and remodelled a two-story frame house at 1745 N. Seventh Street in Grand Junction. The building was meant to serve as a temporary location until an ideal structure could be built. The Mesa County Art Center facility opened its doors November 1960.  The main floor of the house was used for exhibits and recitals.  Painting classes were held upstairs, and ceramics classes were in the basement.  The Art Center boasted 121 members.

By 1965, the Art Center had outgrown the original house. A professional fundraising effort kicked off in October 1967, and the Art Center took over its own campaign several months later.  With the generous help of area residents and businesses, a new building was erected just north of the two-story house.  The facility included a kitchen, classrooms, and an octagonal room with walls designed for exhibits. This room also included a stage for music and dance performances and productions of a community theater group.  The Art Center moved in April, 1970.  The Art Center also purchased additional land north of the new building to Orchard Avenue which now serves as the parking lot.

The Art Center hired its first director in September 1978, and programs were expanded to include more classes and some major juried shows.

In 1982, the Art Center received a $100,000 donation from the Grand Junction Lions Club. This money came with two conditions: Matching funds must be raised from the community and the Art Center must break ground on its second expansion before January 1983.  The Art Center broke ground on the expansion just weeks before the deadline.  This expansion turned a 7,800-square-foot facility into a 14,000-square-foot building.  New features included a large entrance lobby with an art shop, two courtyards, the North Gallery, storage areas, and a ceramics studio.  Storage and dressing rooms were added to the theater area during remodelling of the existing building.  Both the house and the new building were owned free and clear.  The Art Center planned to reopen with an exhibition from the Smithsonian Institution featuring works of 20th century artists, including Pablo Picasso.

Unfortunately, the $750,000 expansion coincided with the collapse of the oil shale industry.  Grand Junction's economy took an abrupt downturn and the population declined as major oil shale extraction operations and other energy-related businesses laid off thousands of workers.  The Arts Center's funding drive to pay for the expansion came up short.

By 1985, the Art Center had 760 members. However, new membership was down, and existing members were renewing at reduced levels. Simultaneously, the operating costs of the Art Center had increased, and both investment and program revenue were down. The Art Center turned its focus to local artists and exhibits, and cut its professional organization memberships.  The director resigned, saying the Art Center could no longer afford his position.

In 1986, 10 members of the Board of Trustees put their own money into sponsoring the biggest juried art show undertaken in Grand Junction to date.  The show, titled ART-USA, was organized in less than four months.  A sum of $10,000 would be divided among the top four artists. The unusually high cash prizes were designed to attract a large number of entries, and announcements were sent to art schools and institutions nationwide.  The board of trustees anticipated thousands of entrants, followed by thousands of visitors to the 6-week exhibition.  ART-USA was the first time the Art Center charged admission to an exhibit.

Following the success of ART-USA, the Art Center sought to reengage the community with events like Mardi Gras celebrations or Elizabethan dinner and theater events.  Emphasis was given to making art fun and accessible for families with the aim of dispelling the perception that the Art Center was an elite club purely for intellectuals.

In 1986, the Art Center Foundation was established.  This endowment is a separate, supporting entity to the Art Center.  At present, the ACF owns most of the permanent art collection housed at the Art Center.

On the heels of a second successful ART-USA exhibit that saw 1,600 entries from across the US and abroad, the Art Center repaid its debts.

In the spring of 1989, Dr. Arch Gould approached the Art Center with an idea:  He would donate $100,000 worth of Navajo rugs to the ACF permanent collection and $100,000 to expand the Art Center facility if the community could raise $100,000 for the long-term maintenance of the collection.  A collector from the eastern United States promised six additional rugs worth an estimated $75,000.  The new space, dubbed the Gould Gallery, was dedicated in January 1991.

Beginning in the 1990s, the Art Center found itself struggling once again with space restrictions, high use and limited finances.  The Art Center tried twice to negotiate a loan from the city of Grand Junction, but was unsuccessful.  In 1992, an emergency membership drive was staged, and the board reluctantly agreed to charge a general admission fee to the Art Center as a "last resort."  The generosity of local patrons and shrewd management kept the doors to the Art Center open through the tight local economy of the 1990s, when the area was once again experiencing the detrimental effects of a downturn in the energy industry.

The Art Center has tried twice to relocate for the sake of space. In 1993, the Art Center abandoned plans to move into the old Main Street Mercantile building when another buyer beat it to the purchase.  In 2001, the Art Center approached city parks officials with a proposal to build a new art center on a former mill-tailings site near the Colorado River, adjacent to the Grand Junction Botanical Gardens, but this relocation plan was eventually shelved in favor of addressing more immediate goals at the current center. The Art Center devoted itself to maximizing use of the current space and expanding existing programs.

2000s
During the global economic downturn that began in 2008, multiple arts venues and businesses in Grand Junction closed, and the Art Center was not alone in dealing with declining contributions from membership, corporations and foundations.  State funding via the Colorado Council on the Arts also became uncertain as the Colorado Legislature struggled to balance the budget. However, the Art Center was better prepared to weather this economic challenge than previous ones.

In 2009, High Noon Solar donated and installed a 9.02-KW solar electric grid tie system to the Art Center, and Blue Moon Electric donated time and energy to help wire the system.

In 2009, the Art Center also sponsored a used bookstore, filled with books donated by local artists, to raise funds for the young adult intern and scholarship programs.  This temporary bookstore has become a permanent feature of the Art Center and now includes donated art supplies and craft materials.

Presently, the Art Center is focused on enhancing learning opportunities for all ages and skill levels and providing exhibits for all tastes. Recent renovations totaling $80,000 have adapted the building to meet the requirements of the American With Disabilities Act. These adjustments are particularly well-timed considering that the Artability program, which promotes artistic opportunity for all individuals, including those with social, mental and physical challenges, has grown from 41 participants in 2009 to 440 in 2015.

References

External links
 Western Colorado Center for the Arts

Grand Junction, Colorado
Arts centers in Colorado
Tourist attractions in Mesa County, Colorado